Meridian Hall is a major performing arts venue in Toronto, Ontario, and it is the country's largest soft-seat theatre. The facility was constructed for the City of Toronto municipal government and is currently managed by TO Live, an arms-length agency and registered charity created by the city.  Located at 1 Front Street East, the venue opened as the O'Keefe Centre on October 1, 1960. From 1996 to 2007, the building was known as the Hummingbird Centre for the Performing Arts. From 2007 to 2019, it was known as the Sony Centre for the Performing Arts. On September 15, 2019, it was re-branded as Meridian Hall.

In 2008, the City of Toronto designated the theatre a heritage building. That year, it also underwent renovations to restore its iconic features such as the marquee canopy and York Wilson's lobby mural, The Seven Lively Arts. Restoration of the wood, brass and marble that were hallmarks of the original facility was undertaken, along with audience seating, flooring upgrades, new washrooms and reconfigured lobby spaces. Following two years of renovations and restoration work, the building reopened its doors on October 1, 2010, fifty years to the date of the first opening night performance.

History
The Centre was built on land formerly occupied by a series of commercial buildings, including the Canadian Consolidated Rubber Company, and previously it was the site of the Great Western Railway Terminal (later the Toronto Wholesale Fruit Market).

The idea for a performing arts centre that could serve the needs of an increasingly dynamic city predates the building's opening by almost 20 years. In the mid-1940s, Nathan Phillips issued a challenge to Toronto industrialists to underwrite the cost of a multipurpose centre for theatre, music and dance. Response to Phillips' challenge was not immediate. E.P. Taylor, the racehorse-loving head of Canadian Breweries, which owned O'Keefe Brewing, offered in early 1955 to build a performing arts centre that would not only serve the needs of local institutions but increase the diversity of entertainment options available in Toronto. Toronto City Council immediately accepted the proposal in principle, but not until 1958 was the project finally approved to be built. Among others, United Church spokesmen opposed the idea that money from the sale of beer would be used for community development. Taylor assigned one of his key executives, Hugh Walker, to oversee building what was to be known, during its first 36 years, as the O'Keefe Centre.

The O'Keefe Centre opened on October 1, 1960, with a red-carpet gala. The first production was Alexander H. Cohen's production of the pre-Broadway premiere of Lerner and Loewe's Camelot, starring Richard Burton, Julie Andrews and Robert Goulet. Camelot was followed by musical productions featuring such artists as Ethel Merman, Mickey Rooney, Angela Lansbury, Alfred Drake, Yul Brynner, Carol Channing, Pearl Bailey, Katharine Hepburn and Rudolf Nureyev.

Popular music artists including Bob Dylan, Janet Jackson, Elton John, Steve Earle, Leonard Cohen, Elvis Costello (November 1978), David Bowie (June 1974), Lou Reed (June 2000),  and bands such as The Grateful Dead, The Who, Jefferson Airplane (August 1967), Led Zeppelin (November 1969), Radiohead (June 2006), The Carpenters, The Clash (September 1979) and Beastie Boys (September 2007) played concerts at the performing arts venue.

Other artists who have performed on the arts venue's stage in a range of solo shows, revues and jazz spectaculars include: Louis Armstrong, Duke Ellington, Marlene Dietrich, Diana Ross, Anne Murray, Tom Jones, Danny Kaye, Judy Garland, Sammy Davis Jr., Bill Cosby, Jack Benny, Liza Minnelli and Liberace. The venue has also played host to several large-scale ballet and dance performances: the National Ballet of Canada held seasonal performances at the venue from 1964 to 2006, and the venue has also seen frequent visits by the Royal Winnipeg Ballet and Les Grands Ballets Canadiens. The venue has also welcomed a wide range of international dance companies such as Les Ballets Africains, Britain's Royal Ballet, New York City Ballet, Dance Theatre of Harlem, the Dutch National Ballet, the National Ballet of Cuba, Alvin Ailey American Dance Theater, Ballet Folklorico of Mexico, as well as the Kirov and Bolshoi Ballet companies from the then-Soviet Union. It was during a 1974 Bolshoi visit that a young Mikhail Baryshnikov defected from the Soviet Union by escaping the venue into a waiting getaway car, aided by later Jim Peterson  and businessman Tim Stewart.

Like The National Ballet, The Canadian Opera Company made the Centre its home stage, from as early as 1961 to 2006. Many of Canada's greatest singers, as well as many international opera stars, have performed for Centre audiences in COC productions. In addition, although touring opera is now rare, in earlier days the performing arts venue played host to The Met and to such well-known performers as Birgit Nilsson, Plácido Domingo and Renata Scotto.

In early February 1996, the facility was renamed the Hummingbird Centre in recognition of a major gift from a Canadian software company, Hummingbird Communications Ltd. The $5-million donation allowed the Centre to undertake a number of capital improvements and repairs, including the installation of an elevator and an acoustic reinforcement system for the auditorium. In October 2006, OpenText acquired Hummingbird and declined to renew its contract with the centre. In September 2007, Sony bought the naming rights to the Centre for $10-million, and a ten-year partnership was born. When the Ballet and Opera moved to the Four Seasons Centre in 2006, it left a hole in the theatre's schedule. At this point, programming shifted to a multicultural schedule by include more content appealing to Toronto's many ethnic diasporas. Notable performances that reflect this mandate include The Last Empress (a Korean historical musical), the Virsky Ukrainian Dance Company, South Africa's Soweto Gospel Choir, The Shaolin Warriors, Ricky Cheng, David Rudder & Friends and Club Tropicana.

In 2006, the performing arts venue received approval from the City of Toronto for the development of a high-rise condominium building beside the Centre. Designed by architect Daniel Libeskind (who also designed the Crystal addition to the Royal Ontario Museum), the L Tower was built on the southwest corner of the property. The Sony Centre closed on 26 June 2008 to begin the theatre renovations, which were unveiled on October 1, 2010.

In June 2012, the Sony Centre hosted the Canadian premiere of the Philip Glass and Robert Wilson opera Einstein on the Beach.

On 21 January 2019, the City of Toronto announced a C$30.75 million 15-year partnership with Meridian Credit Union, re-branding the Sony Centre into Meridian Hall, and the Toronto Centre for the Arts into the Meridian Arts Centre. The arts venues formally adopted their new names on September 15, 2019.

Architecture 
Designed by Peter Dickinson, the performing arts venue is a distinctive building and an example of a mid-twentieth century modern performing arts venue. It is four storeys high and is broken up into three main forms: the entrance block, auditorium and fly tower. The central form of the building is highly symmetrical with an open floor plan. Structurally, the performing arts venue is not overcomplicated and uses steel trusses and concrete to hold the majority of the building together. In addition to the structure, the performing arts venue's auditorium houses a very sophisticated acoustic system, which gives the audience the sense that the sound is surrounding them.

When it comes to materiality, the majority of the original materials are still in the building today. Materials used include: Alabama limestone, glazing, granite, copper, bronze, Carrara marble, carpet, cherry plywood panels and Brazilian rosewood. The performing arts venue is very diverse in its range of materials and employs them in such a way that they are not overshadowed by the unique forms of the building.

See also

Other performing arts venues in the city include:
 Budweiser Stage
 Four Seasons Centre
 Massey Hall
 Meridian Arts Centre
 Roy Thomson Hall

References

Bibliography

Further reading
 O'Keefe, John. "Sound Strategies." Canadian Architect 43.3 (March 1998): 18-19
 "The O'Keefe Centre for the Performing Arts, Toronto." Royal Architectural Institute of Canada 37 (Nov 1960): 461-488

External links

 Official website
 The Canadian Encyclopedia article

Theatres in Toronto
Modernist architecture in Canada
Peter Dickinson (architect) buildings
Music venues in Toronto